Aunque mal paguen (English title: Destiny) is a Venezuelan telenovela written by Alberto Barrera Tyszka and produced by Venevisión in 2007.

María Antonieta Castillo and Miguel de León star as the main protagonists while Ana Karina Manco, Desideria D'Caro and Josué Villae star as antagonists.

Plot
Soledad is a young, beautiful woman who lives in the small, quiet town of El Guayabo where she works at the local tobacco factory "Caribana" as a winder. One night, destiny brings her to meet Alejandro, a young and ambitious developer from the city who has lost his memory after being hit on the head and robbed of his possessions. After a while, the townspeople discover that Alejandro is the owner of the town and the man behind the development project of a beach resort that will destroy their simple way of life, their homes and the tobacco lands surrounding the factory which forms their only source of income. Everyone begins to treat him with hostility, although he himself is yet to regain his memory.

It is after this discovery that it is revealed that Soledad's real mother who was thought to be dead is actually alive. Catalina spent the last 20 years in prison for killing her abusive husband who was actually the son of the town's patriarch, Don Luis Santana, owner of the tobacco factory. Because of this, she is the only legitimate heir and owner of the tobacco lands and thus, she can undo the sale of the lands to the developer. Don Luis, who is aware of Soledad's true paternity, offers Catalina a deal that if she saves the town from ruin, then he will reunite her with her daughter.

Mother and daughter do not know of each other's existence, as Soledad thinks that the parents that raised her are her real parents while Catalina thinks that her daughter was adopted in another country. Mother and daughter will finally be reunited, but they will both fall in love with the same man, thus tearing them apart.

Cast

María Antonieta Castillo as Soledad
Miguel de León as Alejandro Aguerrevere
Ana Karina Manco as Catalina Quiroz 
Marialejandra Martín as Thaís
Roberto Lamarca as Rubén Darío
Crisol Carabal as Amparo/Aguamiel
Amilcar Rivero as Sargento Salazar
Desideria D'Caro as María Fernanda
Yul Bürkle as Tómas
Javier Paredes as Miguel
Bebsabé Duque as Tibisay 
Josué Villae as Esteban
Antonio Cuevas  as Rafael
Rhandy Piñango as Padre Ignacio
Alba Valvé as Margarita
Reinaldo José Pérez as Edmundo
Paula Bevilacqua as Marilyn
César Román as Andrés
Gregorio Milano as Taparita
Freddy Aquino as Toñito
Marjorie Magri as Tamara
Alejo Felipe as Don Luis Santana
Flor Elena González as Doña Carmen
José Torres as Cheche
Tania Sarabia as  Titina
Francis Romero as Sagrario
Beatriz Vázquez as Inés

References

External links
 

2007 telenovelas
Venevisión telenovelas
Venezuelan telenovelas
2007 Venezuelan television series debuts
2008 Venezuelan television series endings
Spanish-language telenovelas
Television shows set in Venezuela